Murodali Aknazarov (born 19 November 2004) is a Tajikistani footballer who currently plays for the academy of Antalyaspor of the Turkish Süper Lig.

Club career
Aknazarov joined Antalyaspor in January 2020. In summer 2021 he saw his first first-team action for the club.

International career
Aknazarov represented Tajikistan at the under-12 level in an international tournament in South Korea in 2015. He went on to score two goals in the tournament, one against the representative team from Mongolia's Sükhbaatar Province and a team from the host nation.  

He was then part of his nation's squad that competed in the 2018 CAFA Youth Championship. Tajikistan went on to win bronze in the tournament.

Aknazarov was called up to the senior national team for the first time in November 2022 for a friendly versus Russia.

References

External links
 Soccerway profile
 Global Sports Archive profile
 TFF profile
 Antalyaspor profile

Living people
2004 births
Tajikistani footballers
Association football midfielders